The Bell Ranch is a historic ranch in Tucumcari, New Mexico, United States of America.

Location
Lying along La Cinta Creek near the Canadian River, the ranch is bordered by Conchas Lake in San Miguel County, New Mexico about 30 miles (97 km) from Tucumcari, New Mexico. The land originally totaled 656,000 acres (2,655 km²) of rolling grasslands bordered by red rimrocked canyons and flat-topped mountains called mesas. It now spans  of land.

History
The Native Americans, Comanche, Kiowa and Apache, hunted the buffalo and ground their corn in well-placed grinding holes where they could scan the horizon for friend and foe. Pictographs carved in the red cliffs indicate the native Americans may well have been living there a long time before the 16th century.

The ranch originated from a Mexican land grant held by Don Pablo Montoya in 1824, only three years after Mexico had gained independence from Spain. It also included the Baca Float No. 2. In 1875, it was named after the bell-shaped mountain on its land by then-owner Wilson Waddingham. Upon acquisition of New Mexico Territory, the U.S. Cavalry established a temporary post at the Bell Ranch Headquarters for a time, using a part of the manager's house as a "map room" and post office while surveying the surrounding area. Charles Goodnight of the Goodnight Cattle trail utilized one of the prominent mesas of the ranch, Gavilan, to navigate on the way to Colorado with his cattle herds.

Early ranch operations
The ensuing century brought a some pioneering individuals. One person, British-born John H. Culley, came as a young man to learn about ranching in northeastern New Mexico. He served as assistant manager in the late 19th century. Educated at Oxford, he recorded the ranch life in his book Cattle, Horses and Men. He wrote "It is -for I know it- a world where the summers are long and hot and if in winter a flurry of snow comes, it is gone by noon; where things grow readily in the loose red soil and the rim rocks are vermilion. A world where few pines are to seen,[sic] but the hill and mesa sides are covered with juniper and the flats with mesquite, and the sunflowers grow higher than a man on horseback in the bottoms."

Later, Albert K. Mitchell served as manager. His list of accomplishments included President of the American Hereford Cattle Breeders Association, an elected member of the New Mexico State House of Representatives, President of the New Mexico Cattle Growers Association and a founder of the American Quarter Horse Association. Mitchell, busy with all these responsibilities, used a small plane to commute to all his activities. He built a hangar and runway at the Bell which stands today. He was one of the first to use airplane flight to commute for agricultural pursuits.

In the 1930s, the ranch was acquired by Guy Waggoner, who built the 10,300-square-foot hacienda on the ranch. His two children sold the ranch after his death.

In 1947, the ranch went through a significant re-division with the Bell Ranch headquarters, the name, and brand being retained with approximately 130,000 acres (526 km²) near the center of the Montoya grant and five other portions sectioned off. This was purchased by Harriet Keeney of Connecticut and her family.

Present day
In more modern times, the Bell Ranch has been known for the quality of beef cattle produced and the pioneering concepts that went into those herds. The concepts of "beef production testing" were laid down at the Bell under the guidance of longtime manager George F. Ellis (manager 1946 to 1970). Over time, the purebred Hereford stock were measured and selected to improve desirable inherited traits. The proven performance advances were significant and groundbreaking. Ellis would be honored with a Lifetime Achievement Award from the Beef Cattle Industry and honors from a host of other established organizations for his work. 

In 1970, ownership of the largest single chunk—so large it has its own Zip Code, 88441—was acquired by William N. Lane II of Chicago, chairman and CEO of publicly traded General Binding Corp., a maker of office supplies and equipment. After Lane died in a 1978 car accident on the ranch, it was owned by his five children through a trust. His son Jeff died in a plane accident on the ranch in 2007. In 2010, the ranch was acquired by Silver Spur Ranches, a ranching company owned by John Malone.

The white faced red Hereford cattle of Ellis' tenure are gone. The present day herds feature of a cross consisting of the original Hereford, Red Angus, Gelbvieh, Brahman to create the "Red Bell" herd. The ranch is home to a private airport known as the Waggoner Airport.

Art and literature
Over the centuries, the Bell Ranch has attracted many notable artists and writers with its beauty and unique qualities. Canadian artist Robert Lougheed visited the ranch numerous times taking inspiration from the horses, people and places to create a body of work recognized by the National Cowboy & Western Heritage Museum. In the 1940s, famed photographer Harvey Caplin took images in black and white. Some of these have been used by the Stetson Hat Company for promotion since that time as the quintessential western iconography.

In 1975, a film called Cowboy Heaven was filmed by David Ellis about the true western cowboy featuring the ranch and the then current cowboys of the Bell. The American Quarter Horse Journal has published well illustrated articles about the ranch on several occasions as had the Western Horseman magazine.

George Ellis wrote about his experiences in the book, The Bell Ranch As I Knew It, covering the Bell operations during his tenure. The book itself won the '74 Wrangler Award for Best Western Book of the Year from the National Cowboy & Western Heritage Museum. He wrote "The Bell is a good ranch - one of the best in the Southwest. Cattle people and college people from all over the world came to visit there." He lists countries represented by these frequent visitors from an impressive five continents. He concludes "The demands and privileges of the Bell touched all our lives - and left them richer."

See also

National Register of Historic Places listings in San Miguel County, New Mexico

References

Further reading

External links
 Panoramic photo of Bell Ranch c. 1914 in the Library of Congress American Memory collection
 Silver Spur Ranches

Buildings and structures in San Miguel County, New Mexico
Ranches on the National Register of Historic Places in New Mexico
Ranches in New Mexico
History of San Miguel County, New Mexico
National Register of Historic Places in San Miguel County, New Mexico